The 1980 Benson & Hedges Cup was the ninth edition of cricket's Benson & Hedges Cup. The Minor Counties were restricted to one team and Scotland entered the competition for the first time.										

The competition was won by Northamptonshire County Cricket Club.

Fixtures and results

Group stage

Group A

Group B

Group C

Group D

Quarter-finals

Semi-finals

Final

References
CricketArchive - 1980 Benson & Hedges Cup

See also
Benson & Hedges Cup											

									

Benson & Hedges Cup seasons
1980 in English cricket